Alberth Idel Bravo Morales (born August 29, 1987) is a Venezuelan sprinter.  He also competed successfully in hurdling and high jump.

Career
At the 2012 and 2016 Summer Olympics, he competed in the Men's 400 metres, and Men's 4 × 400 metres relay.

Personal bests
200 m: 20.96 s (wind: +1.8 m/s) –  Cartagena, 6 July 2013
400 m: 45.21 s A –  Xalapa, 25 November 2014
110 m hurdles: 13.89 s A (wind: 0.9 m/s) –  Sucre, 23 November 2009
High jump: 2.22 m –  San Felipe, 29 September 2006
Long jump: 7.17 m –  Valencia, 15 July 2006
400 m hurdles: 50.36 –  Luque, 24 June 2017

International competitions

References

External links
 
 

Venezuelan male sprinters
Venezuelan male hurdlers
Living people
Olympic athletes of Venezuela
Athletes (track and field) at the 2012 Summer Olympics
Athletes (track and field) at the 2016 Summer Olympics
Athletes (track and field) at the 2015 Pan American Games
1987 births
World Athletics Championships athletes for Venezuela
Venezuelan male high jumpers
South American Games bronze medalists for Venezuela
South American Games medalists in athletics
Competitors at the 2006 South American Games
Central American and Caribbean Games silver medalists for Venezuela
Central American and Caribbean Games bronze medalists for Venezuela
Competitors at the 2010 Central American and Caribbean Games
Competitors at the 2014 Central American and Caribbean Games
Central American and Caribbean Games medalists in athletics
Pan American Games competitors for Venezuela
People from Zulia
20th-century Venezuelan people
21st-century Venezuelan people